Dieusel Berto, (March 24, 1958 – December 29, 2018) was a Haitian professional mixed martial artist, professional wrestler, and kickboxer. He is the father of professional boxers Andre Berto and James Edson Berto. Berto competed at UFC 10 in 1996. for He founded Tiger's World of Martial Arts in Florida.

Background
Originally from Modle, Haiti, Berto moved to Florida in 1980. Berto first worked picking fruit and worked in the restaurant industry. Began training in martial arts. He practiced, Shoodokan and Jeet Kune Do, until he was introduced to the world of professional wrestling, where he was known as ‘The Caribbean Kid.”

Professional wrestling career 
Berto made his professional wrestling debut in 1992 where he worked in Japan for Pro Wrestling Fujiwara Gumi until 1994. His biggest victory was a win over Katsumi Usuda.

On September 10, 1993 Berto wrestled one night for Fighting Network Rings where he lost to Masayuki Naruse.

In 1996, he last wrestled for Battlarts where he would retire from wrestling that year.

Mixed martial arts career
In 1996, Berto competed only at UFC 10 where he lost to Geza Kalman by knockout.

Personal life
In 1996, after retiring from fighting, Berto opened a gym called Tigers World of Martial Arts where he trained MMA fighters and creating fitness programs. In 1998, he was critically injured in a car crash where he broke many bones confining him to a wheelchair. Later he was able to walk again.

On November 17, 2001, he returned for one more fight losing to Chris Kaouk.

On December 29, 2018 Berto died at the age of 60 after battling an illness.

In 2021, Berto was inducted into the FL MMA Hall of Fame.

Mixed martial arts record

|-
| Loss
| align=center| 0-3-0
| Chris Kaouk
| Decision (unanimous)
| Dixie Rumble
| 
| align=center| 3
| align=center| 5:00
| [United States
| Lightweight debut.
|-
| Loss
| align=center| 0-2-0
| Geza Kalman
| TKO (punches)
| UFC 10
| 
| align=center| 1
| align=center| 5:57
| Birmingham, Alabama, United States
| 
|-
| Loss
| align=center| 0-1-0
| Hugh Duarte
| Submission (kimura)
| Universal Vale Tudo Fighting
| 
| align=center| 1
| align=center| 1:28
| Japan
|

References

External links

 

1958 births
2018 deaths
Haitian emigrants to the United States
American male mixed martial artists
American sportspeople of Haitian descent
Haitian male mixed martial artists
Lightweight mixed martial artists
Mixed martial artists utilizing Jeet Kune Do
Mixed martial artists utilizing Shotokan
Mixed martial artists utilizing shoot wrestling
American Jeet Kune Do practitioners
Haitian Jeet Kune Do practitioners
American male karateka
Haitian male karateka